In linguistics, language death occurs when a language loses its last native speaker. By extension, language extinction is when the language is no longer known, including by second-language speakers. Other similar terms include linguicide, the death of a language from natural or political causes, and rarely glottophagy, the absorption or replacement of a minor language by a major language.

Language death is a process in which the level of a speech community's linguistic competence in their language variety decreases, eventually resulting in no native or fluent speakers of the variety. Language death can affect any language form, including dialects. Language death should not be confused with language attrition (also called language loss), which describes the loss of proficiency in a first language of an individual.

In the modern period (–present; following the rise of colonialism), language death has typically resulted from the process of cultural assimilation leading to language shift and the gradual abandonment of a native language in favour of a foreign lingua franca, largely those of European countries.

As of the 2000s, a total of roughly 7,000 natively spoken languages existed worldwide. Most of these are minor languages in danger of extinction; one estimate published in 2004 expected that some 90% of the currently spoken languages will have become extinct by 2050.

Types

Language death is typically the outcome of language shift and may manifest itself in one of the following ways:
 Gradual language death: the most common way that languages die. Generally happens when the people speaking that language interact with speakers of a language of higher prestige. This group of people first becomes bilingual, then with newer generations the level of proficiency decreases, and finally no native speakers exist.  
 Bottom-to-top language death: occurs when the language starts to be used for only religious, literary, ceremonial purposes, but not in casual context. (As in Latin or Avestan.)  
 Top-to-bottom language death: happens when language shift begins in a high-level environment such as the government, but still continues to be used in casual context. 
 Radical language death: the disappearance of a language when all speakers of the language cease to speak the language because of threats, pressure, persecution, or colonisation.
 Linguicide (also known as sudden death, language genocide, physical language death, and biological language death): occurs when all or almost all native speakers of that language die because of natural disasters, wars etc. In the case of linguicide and radical death, language death is very sudden therefore the speech community skips over the semi speaker phase where structural changes begin to happen to languages.The languages just disappear.
 Language attrition: the loss of proficiency in a language at the individual level
 Death of all speakers: The death of all native speakers in a speech community. Death of all speakers can occur through warfare, genocide, epidemic diseases and natural disasters.
 Change in the land of a speech community: This occurs when members of a speech community leave their traditional lands or communities and move to towns with different languages. For example, in a small isolated community in New Guinea, the young men of the community move to towns for better economic opportunities. The movement of people puts the native language in danger because more children become bilingual which makes the language harder to pass down to future generations.
 Cultural contact and clash: Culture contact and clash affects how the community feels about the native language. Cultural, economic and political contact with communities that speak different languages are factors that may alter a community's attitude towards their own language.

The most common process leading to language death is one in which a community of speakers of one language becomes bilingual with another language, and gradually shifts allegiance to the second language until they cease to use their original, heritage language. This is a process of assimilation which may be voluntary or may be forced upon a population. Speakers of some languages, particularly regional or minority languages, may decide to abandon them because of economic or utilitarian reasons, in favor of languages regarded as having greater utility or prestige.

Languages with a small, geographically isolated population of speakers can die when their speakers are wiped out by genocide, disease, or natural disaster.

Definition
A language is often declared to be dead even before the last native speaker of the language has died. If there are only a few elderly speakers of a language remaining, and they no longer use that language for communication, then the language is effectively dead. A language that has reached such a reduced stage of use is generally considered moribund. Half of the spoken languages of the world are not being taught to new generations of children. Once a language is no longer a native language—that is, if no children are being socialized into it as their primary language—the process of transmission is ended and the language itself will not survive past the current generations.

Language death is rarely a sudden event, but a slow process of each generation learning less and less of the language until its use is relegated to the domain of traditional use, such as in poetry and song. Typically the transmission of the language from adults to children becomes more and more restricted, to the final setting that adults speaking the language will raise children who never acquire fluency. One example of this process reaching its conclusion is that of the Dalmatian language.

Consequences on grammar
During language loss—sometimes referred to as obsolescence in the linguistic literature—the language that is being lost generally undergoes changes as speakers make their language more similar to the language to which they are shifting. This process of change has been described by Appel (1983) in two categories, though they are not mutually exclusive. Often speakers replace elements of their own language with something from the language they are shifting toward. Also, if their heritage language has an element that the new language does not, speakers may drop it.
 overgeneralization;
 undergeneralization;
 loss of phonological contrasts;
 variability;
 changes in word order;
 morphological loss, such as was seen in Scottish Gaelic in East Sutherland, Scotland (Dorian: 1978) as fluent speakers still used the historic plural formation, whereas semi-speakers used simple suffixation or did not include any plural formation at all;
 synthetic morphosyntax may become increasingly analytic;
 syntactic loss (i.e. lexical categories, complex constructions);
 relexification;
 loss of word-formation productivity;
 style loss, such as the loss of ritual speech;
 morphological leveling;
 analogical leveling.

Health consequences for Indigenous communities
When a language dies, a complex loss occurs beyond speech, including connection to identity and well-being particularly in Indigenous communities, as many Indigenous peoples' identity, autonomy, and spiritual sovereignty are highly interwoven with their connection to their traditional language. Given that cultural identity, language, and social traditions are deeply interwoven, language loss can be a fundamental factor of ill health in Indigenous communities.

The National Aboriginal Community Controlled Health Organization (NACCHO) defines health as not merely the physical well-being of an individual but also as social, emotional, and cultural well-being of the whole community. For Aboriginal communities in Australia, language loss, as part of broad colonial attempts at culturicide, is part of a cultural loss that plays a key role in ongoing intergenerational trauma reinforcing health inequity. Linguicide plays an active role in ongoing intergenerational trauma of the Stolen Generations, which is known to negatively impact mental health, and is implicated in high suicide rates.

Similar forced assimilation practices instrumental in colonial linguicide such as removal of children to residential schools have created language loss in Indigenous communities around the world. As a consequence Indigenous peoples experience heightened negative mental health effects, such as substance abuse, trauma, and depression. A study conducted on Aboriginal youth suicide rates in Canada found that Indigenous communities in which a majority of members speak the traditional language exhibit low suicide rates. Contrary, suicide rates were six times higher in groups where less than half of its members communicate in their ancestral language.

Many Indigenous communities take on a holistic view of health, in which a connection to culture and language is essential to well-being. Together, culture and language build the foundation of a collective identity. Thus, language death can have severe effects on health.

Language revitalization 

Language revitalization is an attempt to slow or reverse language death. Revitalization programs are ongoing in many languages, and have had varying degrees of success.

The revival of the Hebrew language in Israel is the only example of a language's acquiring new first language speakers after it became extinct in everyday use for an extended period, being used only as a liturgical language. Even in the case of Hebrew, there is a theory that argues that "the Hebrew revivalists who wished to speak pure Hebrew failed. The result is a fascinating and multifaceted Israeli language, which is not only multi-layered but also multi-sourced. The revival of a clinically dead language is unlikely without cross-fertilization from the revivalists' mother tongue(s)."

Other cases of language revitalization which have seen some degree of success are Irish, Welsh, Basque, Hawaiian, Cherokee  and Navajo. 

Reasons for language revitalization vary: they can include physical danger affecting those whose language is dying, economic danger such as the exploitation of natural resources, political danger such as genocide, or cultural danger such as assimilation. During the past century, it is estimated that more than 2,000 languages have already become extinct. The United Nations (UN) estimates that more than half of the languages spoken today have fewer than 10,000 speakers and that a quarter have fewer than 1,000 speakers; and that, unless there are some efforts to maintain them, over the next hundred years most of these will become extinct. These figures are often cited as reasons why language revitalization is necessary to preserve linguistic diversity. Culture and identity are also frequently cited reasons for language revitalization, when a language is perceived as a unique "cultural treasure". A community often sees language as a unique part of their culture, connecting them with their ancestors or with the land, making up an essential part of their history and self-image.

According to Ghil'ad Zuckermann, "language reclamation will become increasingly relevant as people seek to recover their cultural autonomy, empower their spiritual and intellectual sovereignty, and improve wellbeing. There are various ethical, aesthetic, and utilitarian benefits of language revival—for example, historical justice, diversity, and employability, respectively."

Factors that prevent language death 
Google launched the Endangered Languages Project aimed at helping preserve languages that are at risk of extinction. Its goal is to compile up-to-date information about endangered languages and share the latest research about them.

Anthropologist Akira Yamamoto has identified nine factors that he believes will help prevent language death:
 There must be a dominant culture that favors linguistic diversity
 The endangered community must possess an ethnic identity that is strong enough to encourage language preservation
 The creation and promotion of programs that educate students on the endangered language and culture
 The creation of school programs that are both bilingual and bicultural
 For native speakers to receive teacher training
 The endangered speech community must be completely involved 
 There must be language materials created that are easy to use
 The language must have written materials that encompass new and traditional content
 The language must be used in new environments and the areas the language is used (both old and new) must be strengthened

Dead languages 

Linguists distinguish between language "death" and the process where a language becomes a "dead language" through normal language change, a linguistic phenomenon analogous to pseudoextinction. This happens when a language in the course of its normal development gradually morphs into something that is then recognized as a separate, different language, leaving the old form with no native speakers. Thus, for example, Old English may be regarded as a "dead language" although it changed and developed into Middle English, Early Modern English and Modern English. Dialects of a language can also die, contributing to the overall language death. For example, the Ainu language is slowly dying: "The UNESCO Atlas of the World's Languages in Danger lists Hokkaido Ainu as critically endangered with 15 speakers ... and both Sakhalin and Kuril Ainu as extinct." The language vitality for Ainu has weakened because of Japanese becoming the favoured language for education since the end of the nineteenth century. Education in Japanese heavily impacted the decline in use of the Ainu language because of forced linguistic assimilation.

Language change 
The process of language change may also involve the splitting up of a language into a family of several daughter languages, leaving the common parent language "dead". This has happened to Latin, which (through Vulgar Latin) eventually developed into the Romance languages, and to Sanskrit, which (through Prakrit) developed into the New Indo-Aryan languages. Such a process is normally not described as "language death", because it involves an unbroken chain of normal transmission of the language from one generation to the next, with only minute changes at every single point in the chain. Thus with regard to Latin, for example, there is no point at which Latin "died"; it evolved in different ways in different geographic areas, and its modern forms are now identified by a plethora of different names such as French, Portuguese, Spanish, Italian, etc. Language shift can be used to understand the evolution of Latin into the various modern forms. Language shift, which could lead to language death, occurs because of a shift in language behaviour from a speech community. Contact with other languages and cultures causes change in behaviour to the original language which creates language shift.

Measuring language vitality
Except in case of linguicide, languages do not suddenly become extinct; they become moribund as the community of speakers gradually shifts to using other languages. As speakers shift, there are discernible, if subtle, changes in language behavior. These changes in behavior lead to a change of linguistic vitality in the community.  There are a variety of systems that have been proposed for measuring the vitality of a language in a community. One of the earliest is the GIDS (Graded Intergenerational Disruption Scale) proposed by Joshua Fishman in 1991. A noteworthy publishing milestone in measuring language vitality is an entire issue of Journal of Multilingual and Multicultural Development devoted to the study of ethnolinguistic vitality, Vol. 32.2, 2011, with several authors presenting their own tools for measuring language vitality. A number of other published works on measuring language vitality have been published, prepared by authors with varying situations and applications in mind. These include works by Arienne Dwyer, Martin Ehala, M. Lynne Landwehr, Mark Karan,  András Kornai, and Paul Lewis and Gary Simons.

See also 

Classical language
Cultural genocide
Cultural hegemony
Directorate of Language Planning and Implementation
Endangered language
Lists of endangered languages
Ethnocide
Extinct language
Lists of extinct languages
International auxiliary language
Language contact
Language movement
Language policy
Language revitalization
Language shift
Lingua Libre
Linguistic discrimination
Linguistic imperialism
Linguistic purism
Linguistic rights
List of last known speakers of languages
Minority language
Native Tongue Title
Prestige language
Regional language
Rosetta Project
The Linguists (documentary film)

References

Further reading 

 Abley, Mark. (2003). Spoken here: Travels among threatened languages. London: Heinemann.
 Aitchinson, Jean. (1991). Language change: progress or decay? Cambridge: Cambridge University Press.
 Bastardas-Boada, Albert (2007). "Linguistic sustainability for a multilingual humanity", Glossa. An Interdisciplinary Journal, vol. 2, num. 2.
 Batibo, Herman M. (2005). Language decline and death in Africa: Causes, consequences, and challenges. Multilingual Matters.
 Brenzinger, Matthias (Ed.). (1992). Language death: Factual and theoretical explorations with special reference to East Africa. Berlin/New York: Mouton de Gruyter.
 Brenzinger, Matthais (Ed.). (1998). Endangered languages in Africa. Cologne: Rüdiger Köper Verlag.
 Broderick, George. (1999). Language Death in the Isle of Man. Tübingen: Niemeyer. .
 Calvet, Louis-Jean. (1998). Language wars and linguistic politics. Oxford: Oxford University Press.
 Campbell, Lyle. (1994). Language death. In R. E. Asher (Ed.), The Encyclopedia of language and linguistics (pp. 1960–1968). Oxford: Pergamon Press.
 Campbell, Lyle; & Muntzel, M. (1989). The structural consequences of language death. In N. C. Dorian (Ed.).
 Cantoni-Harvey, Gina (Ed.). (1997). Stabilizing indigenous languages. Flagstaff, AZ: Northern Arizona University, Center for Excellence in Education.
 Crystal, David. (2000). Language death. Cambridge: Cambridge University Press. .
 Crystal, David. (2004). Language revolution. Cambridge: Polity Press.
 Cyr, Christine. (2008). "How Do You Learn a Dead Language?". Slate.
 Dalby, Andrew. (2003). Language in danger: The loss of linguistic diversity and the threat to our future. New York: Columbia University Press. .
 Dixon, R. M. W. (1997). The rise and fall of languages. Cambridge: Cambridge University Press.
 Dorian, Nancy C. (1973). Grammatical change in a dying dialect. Language, 49, 413–438.
 Dorian, Nancy C. (1978). The fate of morphological complexity in language death: Evidence from East Sutherland Gaelic. Language, 54 (3), 590–609.
 Dorian, Nancy C. (1981). Language death: The life cycle of a Scottish Gaelic dialect. Philadelphia: University of Pennsylvania Press.
 Dorian, Nancy C. (Ed.). (1989). Investigating obsolescence: Studies in language contraction and death. Studies in the social and cultural foundations of language (No. 7). Cambridge: Cambridge University Press. .
 Dressler, Wolfgand & Wodak-Leodolter, Ruth (eds.) (1977) Language death (International Journal of the Sociology of Language vol. 12). The Hague: Mouton.
 Fishman, Joshua A. (1991). Reversing language shift: Theoretical and empirical foundations of assistance to threatened languages. Clevedon: Multilingual Matters.
 Grenoble, Lenore A.; & Whaley, Lindsay J. (Eds.). (1998). Endangered languages: Current issues and future prospects. Cambridge: Cambridge University Press.
 Hagège, Claude. (1992). Le souffle de la langue. Paris: Odile Jacob.
 Hagège, Claude. (2000). Halte à la mort des langues. Paris: Editions Odille Jacob.
 Hale, Ken; Krauss, Michael; Watahomigie, Lucille J.; Yamamoto, Akira Y.; Craig, Colette; Jeanne, LaVerne M. et al. (1992). Endangered languages. Language, 68 (1), 1-42.
 Harmon, David. (2002). In light of our differences: How diversity in nature and culture makes us human. Washington, D.C.: Smithsonian Institution Press.
 Harrison, K. David. (2007) When Languages Die: The Extinction of the World's Languages and the Erosion of Human Knowledge. New York and London: Oxford University Press. .
 Hazaël-Massieux, Marie-Christine. (1999). Les créoles: L'indispensable survie. Paris: Editions Entente.
 Hill, Jane. (1983). Language death in Uto-Aztecan. International Journal of American Linguistics, 49, 258–27.
 Janse, Mark; & Tol, Sijmen (Eds.). (2003). Language death and language maintenance: Theoretical, practical and descriptive approaches. Amsterdam: John Benjamins Pub. ; .
 Joseph, Brian D. (Ed.). (2003). When languages collide: Perspectives on language conflict, language competition, and language coexistence. Columbus: Ohio State University.
 Maffi, Lusia (Ed.). (2001). On biocultural diversity: Linking language, knowledge, and the environment. Washington, D.C.: Smithsonian Institution Press.
 Maurais, Jacques; & Morris, Michael A. (Eds.). (2003). Languages in a globalizing world. Cambridge: Cambridge University Press.
 Mohan, Peggy; & Zador, Paul. (1986). Discontinuity in a life cycle: The death of Trinidad Bhojpuri. Language, 62 (2), 291–319.
 Motamed, Fereydoon; (1974). La métrique diatemporelle: ou des accords de temps revolutifs dans les langues à flexions quantitatives. "" Open Library OL25631615M.
 Mufwene, Salikoko S. (2001). The ecology of language evolution. Cambridge: Cambridge University Press.
 Mühlhäusler, Peter. (1996). Linguistic ecology: Language change and linguistic imperialism in the Pacific region. London: Routledge.
 Nettle, Daniel; & Romaine, Suzanne. (2000). Vanishing voices: The extinction of the world's languages. Oxford: Oxford University Press. .
 Phillipson, Robert. (2003). English only?: Challenging language policy. London: Routledge.
 Reyhner, Jon (Ed.). (1999). Revitalizing indigenous languages. Flagstaff, AZ: Northern Arizona University, Center for Excellence in Education. .
 Robins, R. H.; & Uhlenbeck, E. M. (1991). Endangered languages. Oxford: Berg.
 Sasse, Hans-Jürgen. (1990). Theory of language death, and, language decay and contact-induced change: Similarities and differences. Arbeitspapier (No. 12). Köln: Institut für Sprachwissenschaft, Universität zu Köln.
 Sasse, Hans-Jürgen. (1992). Theory of language death. In M. Brenzinger (Ed.) (pp. 7–30).
 Schilling-Estes, Natalie; & Wolfram, Walt. (1999). Alternative models of dialect death: Dissipation vs. concentration. Language, 75 (3), 486–521.
 Skutnab-Kangas, Tove. (2000). Linguistic genocide in education—or worldwide diversity and human rights? Mahwah, NJ: Lawrence Erlbaum.
 Slater, Julia. (2010). "Time Takes Its Toll on Old Swiss Language" SwissInfo.ch.
 de Swaan, Abram. (2001). Words of the world: The global language system. Cambridge, UK: Polity Press.
 Thomason, Sarah G. (2001). Language contact: An introduction. Washington, D.C.: Georgetown University Press.
 Zuckermann, Ghil'ad and Michael Walsh. (2011).  'Stop, Revive, Survive: Lessons from the Hebrew Revival Applicable to the Reclamation, Maintenance, and Empowerment of Aboriginal Languages and Cultures', Australian Journal of Linguistics Vol. 31, No. 1, pp. 111–127.

External links 
 Lost Tongues and the Politics of Language Endangerment
 Languages don't kill languages; speakers do
 Language endangerment: What have pride & prestige got to do with It? (pdf)
 Language birth & death (pdf)
 Globalization & the Myth of Killer Languages: What's Really Going on? (pdf)
 International Symposium on "Linguistic Rights in the World: The current situation", United Nations, Geneva, 24 April 2008

Sociolinguistics
Historical linguistics
Education policy
Linguistic rights
Cultural assimilation